Carlo "Carletto" Mazzone (born 19 March 1937) is an Italian retired professional association football player and manager, who played as a centre-back.

Playing career
Born in Rome, Mazzone played several seasons for A.S. Roma, as well as for SPAL and Ascoli. He spent nine seasons with Ascoli, retiring during the 1968–69 season to become the club's manager, in Serie C, helping the team to win the Serie C title in 1972.

Managerial career
Already popular with the Ascoli fans because of his history as a former player for the club, Mazzone gained even more popularity by leading the team for twelve years, up to their historic first ever Serie A appearance. Successively, Mazzone coached several Serie A and Serie B teams, such as Fiorentina, achieving his personal best result in Serie A, a third-place finish during the 1976–77 Serie A season, also winning the Anglo-Italian League Cup in 1975. He subsequently coached Catanzaro, Bologna F.C. 1909, Lecce, Pescara, and Cagliari (1991–93), leading the team to its first appearance in a European competition since the times of Gigi Riva.

After his successes at Cagliari, Mazzone fulfilled his dream, being called to manage his hometown club A.S. Roma for the 1993–94 Serie A season, where he coached a young Francesco Totti. He remained at the helm of A.S. Roma for three seasons, without being able to obtain any notable triumph, however.

Mazzone returned to Cagliari in 1996, and later also briefly coached Napoli (1997–98) the following season, before being sacked. He took charge of Bologna again in 1998, winning the 1998 UEFA Intertoto Cup, and reaching the semi-final of both the 1998–99 UEFA Cup and the 1998–99 Coppa Italia, also qualifying for the 1999–2000 UEFA Cup. He spent the following season with Perugia (1999–2000).

In 2000, he took charge of Serie A newcomers Brescia in 2000, where he had the opportunity to coach Roberto Baggio, and subsequently also Andrea Pirlo, Luca Toni, Igli Tare and Pep Guardiola. During his first season with the club, he helped the club to avoid relegation for the first time in 40 years, leading them to their best ever Serie A finish to qualify for the 2001 UEFA Intertoto Cup, where they reached the final. At Brescia, Mazzone is also remembered for making a ground-breaking decision, becoming the first coach to deploy Pirlo in a deeper creative role, as a deep-lying playmaker, rather than as an offensive midfielder (the role which Baggio occupied; Pirlo particularly excelled in this new role, due to his technique, vision, and long passing ability, and went on to have a highly successful career, earning a reputation as one of the best ever players in his position. The following season, Mazzone was at the centre of controversy, however, when, on 30 September 2001, during a league match against rivals Atalanta, he ran for about 70 meters and screamed towards the Atalanta supporters, guilty of having offended him for the entire match long with personal insults, after his team tied the score in the final minutes. That season, Brescia once again managed to avoid relegation, and also reached the semi-finals of the Coppa Italia, their best ever result in the competition. In 2002, Mazzone was awarded the Panchina d'Oro award, in honour of his career.

After helping the team avoid relegation for the third consecutive season, Mazzone left Brescia in 2003 in order to coach Bologna for the third time in his long career. However, his adventure lasted only two seasons, as the team was surprisingly relegated to Serie B at the end of the 2004–05 Serie A season. It was the first relegation ever in Mazzone's career, and it convinced him to take a break from coaching for a while.

However, on 7 February 2006, at the age of 68 years and 11 months, Mazzone accepted an offer of Livorno, filling the coaching position which had been left vacant by Roberto Donadoni, who resigned the day before; he resigned at the end of the season.

Trivia
Mazzone is the most experienced coach in the Italian football panorama, having coached more than 1,000 professional matches. On 18 March 2006, Mazzone became the Italian manager with the most Serie A matches coached ever, equalling and then overcoming the past record held by Nereo Rocco. His record currently stands at 792 Serie A appearances (excluding five appearances in play-off matches)
Roberto Baggio often defined several times Mazzone as one of the best coaches he met in his playing career. Baggio himself, in a radio interview on 18 February 2006, declared that Mazzone asked him to join him in a playing football comeback in Livorno; however, Baggio claimed that, even if he would have given him an affirmative answer because of his gratitude for what Mazzone did for him, he was forced to refuse because of his physical troubles.
Pep Guardiola said that he learnt a lot from Mazzone during his Brescia years.
He is often nicknamed Sor Carletto because of his Roman origins, and the strong accent typical of the inhabitants of the Italian capital city.
Despite having coached around the whole country for 35 years and more, Mazzone has always held his residence in Ascoli Piceno, home of Ascoli Calcio, the team in which he started his long managing career.

Managerial Statistics

Honours
Ascoli
Serie C (Girone B): 1971–72
Torneo di Capodanno: 1981

Fiorentina
Anglo-Italian League Cup: 1975

Lecce
Serie B (Promotion to Serie A): 1987–88

Bologna
UEFA Intertoto Cup: 1998

Individual
Panchina d'Oro (Career Award): 2002
Italian Football Hall of Fame: 2019

References

1937 births
Living people
Footballers from Rome
Italian footballers
Association football defenders
Serie A players
Serie C players
A.S. Roma players
Latina Calcio 1932 players
S.P.A.L. players
A.C.N. Siena 1904 players
Ascoli Calcio 1898 F.C. players
Italian football managers
Serie A managers
Serie B managers
Serie C managers
Ascoli Calcio 1898 F.C. managers
ACF Fiorentina managers
U.S. Catanzaro 1929 managers
Bologna F.C. 1909 managers
U.S. Lecce managers
Delfino Pescara 1936 managers
Cagliari Calcio managers
A.S. Roma managers
S.S.C. Napoli managers
A.C. Perugia Calcio managers
Brescia Calcio managers
U.S. Livorno 1915 managers